Mexico was the host nation for the 1968 Summer Olympics in Mexico City. 275 competitors, 233 men and 42 women, took part in 146 events in 20 sports.

Medalists

Mexico won a total of 9 medals (3 of each) which is to date the fewest medals won by a host nation at a Summer Olympics. This is nevertheless the highest number of both gold and overall medals that Mexico has ever won at an Olympics.

Athletics

Men
Track and road events

Field events

Combined events – Decathlon

Women
Track and road events

Field events

Combined events – Pentathlon

Basketball

Summary
{|class=wikitable style=font-size:90%;text-align:center
|-
!rowspan=2|Team
!rowspan=2|Event
!colspan=8|Preliminary round
!Semifinal / 
!colspan=2|Final /  / 
|-style=font-size:95%
!OppositionResult
!OppositionResult
!OppositionResult
!OppositionResult
!OppositionResult
!OppositionResult
!OppositionResult
!Rank
!OppositionResult
!OppositionResult
!Rank
|-
|align=left|Mexico men's|align=left|Men's tournament
|W 75–62
|W 76–75
|L 53–60
|W 86–38
|W 73–63
|L 62–82
|W 68–63
|3
| 5th-8th place semifinal W 73–72
| 5th place final W 75–65
|5
|}Team rosterGroup play5th-8th place semifinal5th place finalBoxing

Canoeing

Qualification Legend: QF = Qualify to final; SF = Qualify to semifinal; R=Repechage

Cycling

Road

TrackSprintPursuit

Time trail

Diving

Men

Women

Equestrian

Fencing

14 fencers, 9 men and 5 women, represented Mexico in 1968.

Men's foil
 Héctor Abaunza
 Carlos Calderón
 Román Gómez

Men's team foil
 Vicente Calderón, Román Gómez, Carlos Calderón, Gustavo Chapela, Héctor Abaunza

Men's épée
 Ernesto Fernández
 Carlos Calderón
 Valeriano Pérez

Men's team épée
 Carlos Calderón, Valeriano Pérez, Jorge Castillejos, Ernesto Fernández

Men's sabre
 Vicente Calderón
 William Fajardo
 Gustavo Chapela

Men's team sabre
 William Fajardo, Gustavo Chapela, Héctor Abaunza, Vicente Calderón, Román Gómez

Women's foil
 Pilar Roldán
 Lourdes Roldán
 Rosa del Moral

Women's team foil
 Pilar Roldán, Linda Béjar, Lourdes Roldán, Sonia Arredondo, Rosa del Moral

Football

Gymnastics

Hockey

Modern pentathlon

Three male pentathletes represented Mexico in 1968.

Individual
 Eduardo Olivera
 David Bárcena
 Eduardo Tovar

Team
 Eduardo Olivera
 David Bárcena
 Eduardo Tovar

Rowing

Sailing

Shooting

Eleven shooters, ten men and one woman, represented Mexico in 1968.

25 m pistol
 Rafael Carpio
 Enrique Torres

50 m pistol
 Leopoldo Martínez
 Javier Peregrina

300 m rifle, three positions
 Olegario Vázquez
 José González

50 m rifle, three positions
 José González
 Olegario Vázquez

50 m rifle, prone
 Olegario Vázquez
 Jesús Elizondo

Trap
 Miguel Barrenechea
 Gustavo Zepeda

Skeet
 Nuria Ortíz
 Mario Pani

Swimming

Volleyball

Women's Team CompetitionRound Robin Lost to Peru (2-3)
 Lost to Japan (0-3)
 Lost to Czechoslovakia (0-3)
 Lost to Poland (2-3)
 Lost to South Korea (0-3)
 Lost to Soviet Union (0-3)
 Defeated United States (3-0) → Seventh placeTeam RosterAlicia Cárdeñas
Blanca García
Carolina Mendoza
Eloisa Cabada
Gloria Casales
Gloria Inzua
Isabel Nogueira
María Rodríguez
Patricia Nava
Rogelia Romo
Trinidad Macías
Yolanda Reynoso

Water polo

Men's Team CompetitionPreliminary Round (Group B) Lost to East Germany (4:12)
 Lost to Netherlands (1:8)
 Lost to Yugoslavia (0:9)
 Lost to Italy (5:10)
 Defeated Greece (11:8)
 Lost to Japan (3:6)
 Tied with United Arab Republic (3:3)Classification Matches9th/12th place: Lost to West Germany (3:6)11th/12th place: Defeated Japan (5:4) → Eleventh placeTeam Roster'''
Carlos Morfin
Daniel Gómez
Francisco García Moreno
Germán Chávez
José Vásquez
Juan García
Luis Guzmán
Oscar Familiar
Rolando Chávez
Sergio Ramos
Virgilio Botella

Weightlifting

Wrestling

References

External links
Official Olympic Reports
International Olympic Committee results database

Nations at the 1968 Summer Olympics
1968
1968 in Mexican sports